Nomi was a network of retail supermarkets in Poland, owned by Nomi SA with its registered office in Kielce and a sales office in Warsaw. Nomi has about 20 stores in which approximately 1,800 people work. Since 2007, Nomi SA has been part of the Polish capital group managed by i4ventures.

On 28 May 2011 a fire broke out in the Leszno store that destroyed the entire building. On 30 December 2012 the store in Bydgoszcz closed, thereby leaving the only store in Kujawsko-Pomorskie located in Inowrocław. At the end of 2013, the company announced systemic bankruptcy. Since then, the decision has been made to close down the store in Koszalin, Stargard, Kielce, Radom, Tczew, Świętochłowice, Siemianowice Śląskie, Kluczbork, Płock and Pabianice. 

In 2015, the company entered the liquidation bankruptcy phase. Bricomarche currently owns over 10 locations of the retail shop locations formerly ran by Nomi.

References 

Supermarkets of Poland
Retail companies established in 1993
Retail companies disestablished in 2015
Convenience stores
Polish brands